Adrian Ungur was the defending champion, but lost in the quarterfinals to Mate Delić.

Simone Bolelli won the title, defeating Julian Reister in the final, 6–4, 6–2.

Seeds

Draw

Finals

Top half

Bottom half

External Links
 Main Draw
 Qualifying Draw

Tunis Openandnbsp;- Singles
2014 Singles